Kiyoshi Sekiguchi is a Japanese professional football manager. he the current technical Director J1 League club of Shonan Bellmare. Besides Japan, he has managed in Laos and the Northern Mariana Islands.

Career
In 2010 and since 2014 he coached the Northern Mariana Islands national football team.

References

Year of birth missing (living people)
Living people
Japanese football managers
Expatriate football managers in the Northern Mariana Islands
Northern Mariana Islands national football team managers
Place of birth missing (living people)
Japanese expatriate sportspeople in the Northern Mariana Islands
Japanese expatriate football managers